The Hire-Purchase Act 1967, is a Malaysian law which enacted to regulate the form and contents of hire-purchase agreements, the rights and duties of parties to such agreements and to make provisions for other matters connected therewith and incidental thereto.

Structure
The Hire-Purchase Act 1967, in its current form (30 July 2012), consists of 9 Parts containing 58 sections and 7 schedules (including 10 amendments).
Part I: Preliminary
Part II: Formation and Contents of Hire-Purchase Agreements
Part IIA: Option to Hirer
Part III: Protection of Hirers and Guarantors
Warranties and Conditions
Part IV: Hirers
Statutory rights of hirers 
Part V: Guarantors
Part VI: Insurance
Part VII: General
Part VIII: Powers of Enforcement
Part IX: Regulations, etc.
Schedules

References

External links
 Hire-Purchase Act 1967 

1967 in Malaysian law
Malaysian federal legislation